Following is a list of senators of Corse-du-Sud, people who have represented the department of Corse-du-Sud in the Senate of France.
The department was formed on 15 September 1975, when the department of Corsica was divided into Haute-Corse and Corse-du-Sud.

Fifth Republic 
Senators for Corse-du-Sud under the French Fifth Republic:

References

Sources

 
Corse-du-Sud-related lists
Lists of members of the Senate (France) by department